This is a list of placenames in Scotland which have subsequently been applied to parts of South Africa by Scottish emigrants or explorers.

Eastern Cape
Aberdeen
Albany, South Africa (named after Albany, New York, in turn from the Gaelic name for Scotland, Alba)
Cathcart (George Cathcart)
Grahamstown (John Graham (British Army officer))

KwaZulu-Natal (native)
Balgowan
Dundee
Glencoe
Scottburgh
Kelso, Kwazulu, South Africa

Gauteng
 Suburbs of Johannesburg 
 Abbotsford
 Argyll
 Atholl
 Balmoral
 Birnam
 Blairgowrie
 Brushwood Haugh (Haugh being a Lowland Scots word for meadow)
 Buccleuch
 Craighall
 Douglasdale
 Dunkeld
 Dunnotar
 Dunvegan
 Glen Atholl
 Glen Esk
 Heriotdale
 Kelvin
 Melrose
 Melville
 Moffat View
 Morningside
 Morningside Manor
 Strathavon
 Towns on the East Rand
 Germiston
 Wattville

Mpumalanga
Balfour (formerly "McHattiesburg")

North West Province
Orkney

Northern Cape
Alexander Bay (James Edward Alexander)
Campbell
Sutherland

Western Cape
 Arniston (Arniston, Midlothian)
 Clanwilliam
 Elgin
 Gordon's Bay
 McGregor
Napier
 Pringle Bay
 Robertson (Rev William Robertson)
 Suburbs of Cape Town 
 Airlie
 Balvenie
 Bellville (after Charles Davidson Bell, Surveyor-General of the Cape from 1848 to 1872)
 Bonnie Brook (Burn is the normal form in Scotland)
 Brackenfell
 Clunie 
 Crawford
 Crofters' Valley
 Dunoon
 Dunrobin
 Glencairn
 Lochiel
 Schotsche Kloof - Afrikaans for "Scottish Ravine".
 St Kilda
 The Glen
 Finlay's Point
 Murray's Bay, on Robben Island, named after John Murray, a Scottish whaler 

Scottish place names
South Africa
Scottish placenames